John P. Schaefer is President Emeritus of the University of Arizona, where he had an active, 21-year career in teaching and research. He graduated from Brooklyn Technical High School and Polytechnic Institute of Brooklyn (now NYU Polytechnic School of Engineering).

References

Year of birth missing (living people)
Living people
Polytechnic Institute of New York University alumni
Presidents of the University of Arizona
Brooklyn Technical High School alumni